Neil Hosang (born 10 October 1946) is a Jamaican cricketer. He played in two first-class matches for the Jamaican cricket team in 1974/75.

See also
 List of Jamaican representative cricketers

References

External links
 

1946 births
Living people
Jamaican cricketers
Jamaica cricketers
People from Montego Bay